Quzlu (also Romanized as Qūzlū) is a village in Qoltuq Rural District, in the Central District of Zanjan County, Zanjan Province, Iran. At the 2006 census, its population was 430, in 100 families.

References 

Populated places in Zanjan County